The 1987 Purdue Boilermakers football team represented Purdue University as a member of the Big Ten Conference during the 1987 NCAA Division I-A football season. Led by first-year head coach Fred Akers, the Boilermakers compiled an overall record of 3–7–1 with a mark of 3–5 in conference play, tying for sixth place in the Big Ten. Purdue played home games at Ross–Ade Stadium in West Lafayette, Indiana.

Schedule

Personnel

Preseason
Jeff George transferred following the hiring of Fred Akers as head coach, who had recently been fired from Texas.

Game summaries

at Washington

Louisville
 James Medlock 25 rushes, 126 yards

Notre Dame

at Minnesota

Illinois
 James Medlock 33 rushes, 131 yards

Ohio State

at Iowa

Wisconsin

at Michigan State

Northwestern

at Indiana

References

Purdue
Purdue Boilermakers football seasons
Purdue Boilermakers football